Pajo Kolarić (1821–1876) was an early Croatian composer for tamburitza. Kolarić formed the first amateur tamburitza orchestra in Osijek in 1847. He was a teacher of Mijo Majer.

References

Sources

External links 

Croatian composers
1821 births
1876 deaths
19th-century composers
Burials at Saint Anne Cemetery